Blue Blood is a 1951 American drama film directed by Lew Landers and written by Scott Darling. The film stars Bill Williams, Jane Nigh, Arthur Shields, Audrey Long, Harry Shannon, and Lyle Talbot. The film was released on January 28, 1951, by Monogram Pictures.

Plot

Cast          
Bill Williams as Bill Manning
Jane Nigh as Eileen Buchanan
Arthur Shields as Tim Donovan
Audrey Long as Sue Buchanan
Harry Shannon as Mr. Buchanan
Lyle Talbot as Teasdale
William Tannen as Sparks 
Harry Cheshire as McArthur
Milton Kibbee as Ryan

References

External links
 

1951 films
American drama films
1951 drama films
Monogram Pictures films
Films directed by Lew Landers
1950s English-language films
1950s American films